Sir (James) Edward May, 2nd Baronet (1751? – 23 July 1814) of Mayfield, County Waterford, was an Irish politician who was twice Sovereign of Belfast,  a Member of Parliament in successive Irish and United Kingdom parliaments, and High Sheriff of County Waterford.

He was born the eldest son  of Sir James May, 1st Baronet of Mayfield, and privately educated before entering Trinity College, Dublin (TCD), and studying law at the Middle Temple in London, where he was called to the bar in 1789. He succeeded his father to the baronetcy in 1811.

He was appointed High Sheriff of Waterford for 1781–82.

He was an MP in the Parliament of Ireland in 1800, the last parliament before the Union of Great Britain and Ireland. He continued afterwards as the member for Belfast in the Parliament of the United Kingdom from 1801 to 1814. He also served as Sovereign of Belfast (an earlier title for the mayor) from 1803 to 1806 and 1809 to 1810.

He married twice and had 2 illegitimate sons and 2 daughters. He was accordingly succeeded in the baronetcy by his younger brother Humphrey. An illegitimate daughter, Anna, married The 2nd Marquess of Donegall.

References

|-

1750s births
1814 deaths
People from County Waterford
Alumni of Trinity College Dublin
Members of the Middle Temple
Baronets in the Baronetage of Ireland
High Sheriffs of County Waterford
Members of the Parliament of the United Kingdom for Belfast constituencies (1801–1922)
UK MPs 1801–1802
UK MPs 1802–1806
UK MPs 1806–1807
UK MPs 1807–1812
UK MPs 1812–1818
Mayors of Belfast
Members of the Parliament of Ireland (pre-1801) for Belfast
Irish MPs 1798–1800